Campfire is a 2004 Israeli film written and directed by Joseph Cedar. Set in 1981, the film focuses on a woman seeking to join an Israeli settlement on the West Bank, despite the protests of her teenage daughters.

The film premiered at the 54th Berlin International Film Festival in February 2004. The film won five Israeli Academy Awards and was Israel's official submission for the 77th Academy Awards in the Best Foreign Language Film category (but did not get a nomination). The film was well received in Israel, the United States, and in international film festivals.

Synopsis 
The story of a young widow, mother of two beautiful teenage daughters, who wants to join the founding group of a new settlement of religious Jews in the West Bank, but first must convince the acceptance committee that she is worthy. Things get complicated when the younger daughter is sexually abused by boys from her youth movement.

Cast

References

External links
 
 
 
 Campfire-Medurat Hashevet

2004 films
2004 drama films
2000s Hebrew-language films
Films about Jews and Judaism
Films directed by Joseph Cedar
Israeli drama films
Films about Orthodox and Hasidic Jews